Kennon may refer to:

Places 
Kennon Island, a 0.3-mi-long satellite of Attu Island in the Near Islands group at the extreme western end of the Aleutian Islands, Alaska
Kennon Observatory, astronomical observatory owned and operated by the University of Mississippi
Kennon Road, a roadway in Benguet province, Philippines, connecting the mountain city of Baguio to the lowland town of Rosario in La Union province
Kennon, Virginia, unincorporated community in Charles City County, Virginia, United States

Persons with the surname 
Beverley Kennon (1793–1844), career officer in the United States Navy
James Kennon (1925–1991), British naval officer
Kevin Kennon (born 1958), American architect
Lyman W. V. Kennon (1858–1918), American military officer
Matt Kennon, American singer and songwriter
Paul A. Kennon (1934–1990), American architect
Robert F. Kennon (1902–1988), American politician
Sandy Kennon (1933–2015), South African footballer
Sidney Kennon (died 1754),  British midwife
William Kennon (disambiguation), two persons
Wilson S. Kennon (1826–1895), American politician

Persons with the given name 
Robert Kennon Hargrove (1829–1905), American bishop
Kennon Richard Lewis (born 1939), Australian politician
William Kennon Mayo (1824–1900), American naval officer
Kennon Sheldon, American professor 
Kennon C. Whittle (1891–1967), American lawyer and judge

See also
Matt Kennon (album), the self-titled debut album of American country music singer Matt Kennon
Justice Kennon (disambiguation)